The 1st Infantry Division Museum is a museum located on Fort Riley in Kansas, United States.

Exhibits
The museum covers this history of the 1st Infantry Division (United States) from World War I to the present day.

Visitor restrictions
Since the museum is on an active U.S. Army base, there are restrictions on visitors, including requirements for photo identification.

References

External links

Military and war museums in Kansas
Museums in Geary County, Kansas
United States Army museums